Sucupira is a Chilean telenovela produced  and broadcast by Televisión Nacional de Chile from March 11 to August 9, 1996, starring Héctor Noguera, Delfina Guzmán, Francisco Reyes, Ángela Contreras and Álvaro Rudolphy. It is based on the 1973 Brazilian telenovela O Bem-Amado produced by Rede Globo.
As with other installments during the so-called "golden age of TVN", the production featured an extensive cast, a greater focus on comedy, and an exotic location (the fictional seaside town of Sucupira, shot in Papudo and Zapallar)

Plot summary
The long-serving mayor of a sleepy fishing town is eager to inaugurate his latest campaign promise, a cemetery, but his plans are constantly thwarted by the absence of deaths in the community. The central love triangle is formed by the mayor's free-spirited daughter as she chooses between the town's doctor and the local reporter, both bitter adversaries of her father. The various antics of the town's colorful denizens occupy much of the plot.

Cast

Main cast 
 Héctor Noguera as Federico Valdivieso Montt
 Ángela Contreras as Bárbara Valdivieso Fernández
 Francisco Reyes as Esteban Onetto Sanfuentes
 Viviana Rodríguez	as Sofía Montero
 Álvaro Rudolphy as Rafael Aliaga

Supporting cast 
 Delfina Guzmán as Mariana Montero
 Luis Alarcón as Ambrosio Campos
 Coca Guazzini as Luisa Lineros
 Mauricio Pesutic as Renato Montenegro
 Patricia Rivadeneira as Regina Lineros
 Anita Klesky as Dora Lineros
 José Soza	as Segundo Fábrega
 Claudia Burr as Soledad Campos Gutiérrez
 Álvaro Morales as Raimundo "Rucio" Prado Cárdenas
 Consuelo Holzapfel as Elena Domínguez
  as Ramiro Portela
 Ana Reeves as Carmen Gutiérrez
 Óscar Hernández as Carlos López
 Carmen Disa Gutiérrez as Olguita Marina
 Remigio Remedy as Rodrigo Valdivieso Fernández
 Felipe Braun as Cristián López Domínguez
 Tamara Acosta as Daniela López Domínguez
 Pablo Schwarz as Juan Aravena "Juan del Burro"
 Amparo Noguera as Norma Órdenes
 Francisco Melo as Diógenes Tobar
 Ximena Rivas as Susana de Portela
 Juan Pablo Bastidas as Fernando Rovira
 Valentina Pollarolo as Rocío Ureta
 Mario Montilles as Padre Damián
 Mireya Véliz as Hilda Moya
 Ana Luz Figueroa as Carla Silva
 Catalina Olcay as Francisca Silva
 Mónica Godoy as Loreto Inostroza
 Maité Pascal as Claudia Briceño
 Ricardo Pinto as Jeremías Alegría
 Ernesto Gutiérrez as El Cincuenta
 Samuel Guajardo as El Cabeza de Corcho
 Juan Carlos Montaña as El Pata de Jaiva
 Andrea Molina as Luna del Alba
 Carolina Infante as Catalina García
 Jaime Davagnino as Ángel

References

External links 
 

1996 telenovelas
Chilean telenovelas
Televisión Nacional de Chile telenovelas
1996 Chilean television series debuts
1996 Chilean television series endings
Spanish-language telenovelas